The Burnakura Gold Mine is a gold mine located  northeast of Cue, Western Australia that operated for intermittent periods between 1898 and 2013. It is currently owned by Canadian company Monument Mining Limited.

History

The mine consisted of both underground and open pit mining operations and a 160,000 tonne per annum plant.

First mined in modern times in the 1990s by Metana Minerals NL, Burnakura was later owned by Extract Resources Limited, which brought in Tectonic Resources NL as an operating partner. In 2005, underground production commenced by creating a portal and decline access to ore and milling began late 2005. In April 2007, milling ceased again and in October 2007, ATW purchased the mine for C$8.4 million.

Burnakura commenced production on 3 March 2009 and achieved commercial production in June that year, however due to a series of erratic vein sets with structural offsets, the mine is to be put back on care and maintenance.

Canadian mining company Monument Mining Limited acquired the mine in early 2014 but has not recommenced mining since.

Production
Production of the mine:

See also
 List of active gold mines in Western Australia

References

Bibliography

External links 
 
 MINEDEX website: Murchison / Monument Database of the Department of Mines, Industry Regulation and Safety

Gold mines in Western Australia
Surface mines in Australia
Underground mines in Australia
Shire of Cue